Colin McLean Melville (13 July 1903 – 12 June 1984) was a South African first-class cricketer and educator.

Melville was born in July 1903 at Carnarvon, Cape Colony. He was educated at Michaelhouse, before going up to the University of Natal. From there, he studied in England at Trinity College at the University of Oxford as a Rhodes Scholar. While at Oxford, Melville made a single appearance in first-class cricket for Oxford University against Kent at Oxford in 1928. Batting twice in the match, he was dismissed in the Oxford first innings for a single run while opening the batting by Bernard Howlett, while in their second innings he was dismissed for 28 runs by Bill Ashdown.

After completing his studies at Oxford, Melville returned to South Africa where he became a master at Michaelhouse between 1929 and 1942. He died at Johannesburg in June 1984.

References

External links

1903 births
1984 deaths
People from Pixley ka Seme District Municipality
Alumni of Michaelhouse
University of Natal alumni
South African Rhodes Scholars
Alumni of Trinity College, Oxford
South African cricketers
Oxford University cricketers
South African schoolteachers